Linguistic Imperialism is a book written by Robert Phillipson, research professor at Copenhagen Business School's Department of English, published in 1992 by Oxford University Press.

In Linguistic Imperialism, Phillipson argues that Western countries have used English as a tool of imperialism to dominate colonies and former colonies.  He further explores the ideologies transmitted through the English language.

The book was followed by Linguistic Imperialism Continued, first published by Routledge in 2010.

See also
Cultural imperialism
English as a lingua franca
Hegemony
Linguistic imperialism

References

Sources

1992 non-fiction books
Applied linguistics
Books about education
English as a global language
Interlinguistics
Linguistic rights
Linguistics books
Social sciences books
Sociolinguistics works